Elijah "Lije" Millgram (born 1958) is an American philosopher. He is E. E. Ericksen Professor of Philosophy at the University of Utah. His research specialties include practical reason and moral philosophy.

Elijah Millgram received his Ph.D. from Harvard University in 1991. He taught at Princeton University and Vanderbilt University before moving to Utah. He is a former fellow of the Center for Advanced Study in the Behavioral Sciences and of the National Endowment for the Humanities, and is a 2013 Guggenheim Fellow.

Bibliography
 Millgram, E. (2019). John Stuart Mill and the Meaning of Life. Oxford University Press. 
 Millgram, E. (2015). The Great Endarkenment: Philosophy for an Age of Hyperspecialization.  Oxford University Press. 
Millgram, E. (2009). Hard Truths.  Wiley-Blackwell. 
 Millgram, E. (2005). Ethics Done Right: Practical Reasoning as a Foundation for Moral Theory. Cambridge University Press. 
 Millgram, E. ed. (2001). Varieties of Practical Reasoning. MIT Press. 
 Millgram, E. (1997). Practical Induction. Harvard University Press.

References

See also
 American philosophy
 List of American philosophers

20th-century American philosophers
Harvard University alumni
University of Utah faculty
Princeton University faculty
Vanderbilt University faculty
Living people
Center for Advanced Study in the Behavioral Sciences fellows
1958 births
21st-century American philosophers